Stephanie Sheh is an American voice actress, ADR director, writer and producer who has worked for several major companies, including Cartoon Network and Sony. She is often involved with work in English dubs of anime, cartoons, video games and films. Her notable voice roles include Hinata Hyuga in the Naruto franchise, Orihime Inoue in Bleach, Usagi Tsukino/the title protagonist in the Viz Media redub of Sailor Moon, Yui Hirasawa in K-On!, Eureka in Eureka Seven, Katana in DC Super Hero Girls, Mikuru Asahina in The Melancholy of Haruhi Suzumiya, Mona and Kat in WarioWare Gold, Yui in Sword Art Online, Illyasviel von Einzbern in Fate/stay night, Mamimi Samejima in FLCL, Blanca in White Snake and it's 2021 sequel: Green Snake and Mitsuha Miyamizu in Your Name.

Career
Sheh was born in Kalamazoo, Michigan, and was raised in Northern California.
She spent much of her childhood in Taiwan, where half of her relatives still live and speak Mandarin Chinese and Taiwanese Hokkien. Sheh became interested in being an actress after acting out a school play when she was in her early years in Monta Vista High School in Cupertino, California. While at the University of California, Los Angeles she was involved in anime clubs. After graduating from UCLA in 1999, she took a job as a producer while she pursued her acting career. She got her training and studying on acting, voice acting and improvisation at the Second City Training Center, East West Players, Susan Blu Voiceover Workshop and UCLA School of Theater, Film and Television. Sheh has also recorded radio spots for United States Cellular Corporation.

Under the moniker of Jennifer Sekiguchi, Sheh made her voice acting debut as Silky in I'm Gonna Be An Angel! in 2001. During that time, she worked at Synch-Point, which produced English dubs for anime, in which she produced the dub for I'm Gonna Be An Angel!, besides voicing Silky. She was working with Synch-Point when she brought in Marc Handler to ADR direct and write for FLCL, which she played as one of the main characters, Mamimi.

She would later land starring voice roles as Orihime Inoue in Bleach and Eureka in Eureka Seven. She also voiced supporting character Hinata Hyuga in the hit series Naruto in which her character had a major role in the storyline. The three shows have aired on Cartoon Network with varied success. She describes Hinata's issues with self-esteem as very relatable.

Sheh has been involved in voicing characters in video games such as BioShock 2, Aion: The Tower of Eternity, Devil May Cry 4, Grand Theft Auto V, and Resident Evil 5 as the current voice of Rebecca Chambers on the Resident Evil franchise. Beyond using her voice, Stephanie was flown to Japan to provide the motion capture for the character Cereza in Sega's video game Bayonetta. She also voiced Mlle Blanche de Grace in BioShock 2 and Orihime Inoue in the Bleach series.

Sheh has appeared several times on G4's Attack of the Show! as "Tiny Olivia Munn". In 2012, she was a host in the 2011 Talk-Show TV series BPM: Beats Per Mnet.

In 2011, she formed the fundraising organization We Heart Japan in response to the 2011 Tōhoku earthquake and tsunami.

In 2013, she reprised the role of Eureka in Eureka Seven: Astral Ocean.

In July 2014, Viz Media revealed details behind its upcoming Sailor Moon Blu-ray release and the series' new dub cast at its panel at the 2014 Anime Expo in Los Angeles. Sheh was cast to voice Usagi Tsukino/Sailor Moon in Viz's redub of the first anime series, as well as Crystal.

On February 2, 2017, upon the release of Fire Emblem Heroes, Sheh voiced as Tharja from Fire Emblem Awakening. Sheh later went on to voice later iterations of Tharja herself.

On June 11, 2021, Netflix released the film Wish Dragon, Sheh voiced the audio description provided by Post Haste Digital.

In 2022, Netflix released the film Anittinha's Club: The Movie, Sheh also voiced the audio description  provided by Post Haste Digital.

Filmography

Anime

Animation

Films

Video games

References

Other references
 Interview with Stephanie Sheh by AnimeOmnitude

External links

 
 
 
 

21st-century American actresses
Living people
American actresses of Taiwanese descent
American casting directors
Women casting directors
American voice directors
American television writers
American women screenwriters
American women television writers
American voice actresses
University of California, Los Angeles alumni
American video game actresses
People from Kalamazoo, Michigan
Actresses from Los Angeles
Actresses from Michigan
People from Cupertino, California
American film actresses
Writers from Los Angeles
Actresses from New York City
Writers from New York City
Screenwriters from New York (state)
Screenwriters from California
Screenwriters from Michigan
Year of birth missing (living people)